Mikalauskas is a Lithianian surname. Notable people with the surname include:

Arūnas Mikalauskas, Lithuanian basketball player
Laurynas Mikalauskas, Lithuanian professional basketball player
Vidas Mikalauskas, Lithuanian politician
Neringa Mikalauskienė, birth name of Neringa Dangvydė, Lithuanian writer, poet, book illustrator, and literary critic

See also
Mikułowski

Lithuanian-language surnames
Patronymic surnames